Poganovo is a village/town near Jerma river in the Serbian municipality of Dimitrovgrad, near the border with Bulgaria. The 14th century Serbian Orthodox Poganovo monastery is located at the gorge of Jerma.

Populated places in Pirot District